The El Chocón Dam is the fourth of the five dams on the Limay River in the northwestern Argentine Patagonia (the Comahue region), at  above mean sea level.

El Chocón is used to regulate the flow of the Limay River, for irrigation, and for the generation of hydroelectricity. It was built by the state-owned company Hidronor (Hidroeléctrica Norpatagónica). It started operating in 1973, and achieved full capacity in 1978. In 1993 it was privatized, with an exploitation concession granted to Hidroeléctrica El Chocón S. A.

While the formal name of the project is Embalse Ezequiel Ramos Mexía, in common use it ended up acquiring the name of the settlement that served as the construction's base of operations, Villa El Chocón (a small town, population 957, as of 2001).

El Chocón is part of a larger engineering scheme that also includes the Cerros Colorados Complex, on the Neuquén River. The Hydroelectric Complex which holds El Chocón and Arroyito Hydroelectric Power Plants, is located in the region known as Comahue, which is formed by the Argentine provinces of Río Negro and Neuquén and the southern area of the Buenos Aires and La Pampa provinces.

Technical details 
The dam is made of earth, with a concrete spillway. About  of materials were used. It measures  in length.

It is used for sailing, sport fishing and other forms of recreation by locals and tourists.

Material: Hidroeléctrica El Chocón S.A.

See also 

 List of power stations in Argentina

External links 

 Structural specifications of the dam
 Hydroelectric dams of Argentina
 Fact Sheet on El Chocon Hydroelectric Power Plant from Global Energy Observatory

References

Dams completed in 1973
Energy infrastructure completed in 1973
Energy infrastructure completed in 1978
Dams in Argentina
Hydroelectric power stations in Argentina
Buildings and structures in Río Negro Province
Buildings and structures in Neuquén Province
Dams on the Limay River